Provincial Reconstruction Team Logar (Czech: Provinční rekonstrukční tým Logar) was a Provincial Reconstruction Team that was part of the International Security Assistance Force - an international military force in Afghanistan. PRT Logar was subordinated to ISAF Regional Command East, responsible for the eastern provinces of Afghanistan. Regional Command East with its HQ in Bagram was a U.S.-run Operational Command containing units from several other NATO and non-NATO countries. The task of PRT Logar was to help the Afghan government rebuild and further develop Logar province.

The PRT combined civilian experts from the Czech Ministry of Foreign Affairs and the Czech Army military, whose role was to maintain a secure environment for reconstruction projects. The Czech PRT had proportionally one of the highest numbers of civilian experts in PRT.
The members of the civilian team included construction engines, development specialists and experts in areas such as agriculture, security, media or veterinary medicine. These specialists cooperated with the provincial government, councils of elders (suras) and other representatives of local communities to extend their capacities and, through a broad range of joint projects, to have a positive impact on the province both in mid and long-term.

History
PRT Logar was established on March 19, 2008, as a 26th Provincial Reconstruction Team deployed to Afghanistan. The PRT was located at U.S. Forward Operating Base Shank near capital of the Logar province, Pul-i-Alam. Area of responsibility was 3,800 km2.

PRT Logar, as of July 2008, was composed of 192 troops and 7 civilians. Troops were mostly members of 102nd Reconnaissance Battalion (1st Contingent) with attachments from other units. In August 2008, 102nd Reconnaissance Battalion was replaced by troops of the 7th Mechanized Brigade (2nd Contingent). As of August 2008, PRT Logar was composed of 200 troops and 8 civilians. In March 2009 the troops of the 7th Mechanized Brigade were replaced by troops of the 4th Rapid Deployment Brigade (42nd Mechanized Battalion - 3rd Contingent, 41st Mechanized Battalion - 4th Contingent). As of March 2009, the number of troops was increased to 275 and the number of civilians to 10. As of February 2010, the 7th Mechanized Brigade (72nd Mechanized Battalion - 5th Contingent / 5th Unit) took over again and the number of personnel was further increased to 286 troops and 12 civilians. In August 2010, the 7th Mechanized Brigade (71st Mechanized Battalion - 6th Unit) was deployed and the number of personnel was set to 261 troops and 11 civilians. In February 2011, the 4th Rapid Deployment Brigade (43rd Airborne Battalion - 7th Unit) was deployed and the number of personnel was set to 293 troops and 11 civilians. In August 2011 they were relieved by 102nd Reconnaissance Battalion (8th Unit) and the number of personnel was set to 292 troops and 12 civilians.

Principal Leaders

Civilian Part

Military Part

Casualties

Since March 2008, one soldier of PRT Logar was killed and 17 were wounded by enemy action.

 April 30, 2008, at 1550, Private First Class (rotný in Czech; OR-3) Radim Vaculík, from the 102nd Reconnaissance Battalion, was killed in his M1151 Up-Armored HMMWV by Improvised Explosive Device (IED) composed of anti-tank mine. Four other soldiers were wounded (one of them seriously, two moderately and one lightly) in the same attack. PFC Radim Vaculík was posthumously promoted to Sergeant First Class (praporčík in Czech; OR-7).
 August 25, 2008 one soldier from the Military Police Special Operations Group was moderately injured when a wheel of his vehicle was damaged and the vehicle overturned.
 September 22, 2008, at 0200, two Privates First Class were moderately wounded and one Corporal (rotmistr in Czech; OR-4) was lightly wounded by an Indirect Fire (IDF) attack on FOB Shank.
 October 1, 2008, at 1220, seven soldiers from 7th Mechanized Brigade were wounded (one of them moderately and six lightly) in an ambush, while trying to recover an M1151 Up-Armored HMMWV that got stuck in the wadi. All were hit by shrapnel from the RPG-7.
 November 18, 2008, at 0955, three soldiers from 7th Mechanized Brigade, were lightly wounded in their M1151 Up-Armored HMMWV by Improvised Explosive Device (IED).
 April 17, 2009, shortly before 1400, three soldiers from 4th Rapid Deployment Brigade, were wounded (one of them seriously and two lightly) in their M1151 Up-Armored HMMWV by Improvised Explosive Device (IED).
 April 5, 2010, one soldier from 43rd Airborne Battalion, 4th Rapid Deployment Brigade, on a foot patrol, was lightly wounded in the upper arm by a hand grenade shrapnel.
 July 13, 2011, a Corporal from 43rd Airborne Battalion, 4th Rapid Deployment Brigade, on a foot patrol, was lightly wounded in the leg by enemy small arms fire.
 September 7, 2012, a Corporal at FOB Shank was heavily wounded by shrapnel from enemy indirect fire.

Awards and decorations

Czech soldiers who deploy to Afghanistan (for at least 30 consecutive days) receive Medal of the Minister of Defense for Service Abroad - Afghanistan. Also, Czech soldiers are eligible for NATO Non-Article 5 Medal after 30 either continuous or accumulated days on deployment in Afghanistan.

See also
Afghanistan War order of battle
Counter-insurgency
International Security Assistance Force (ISAF)
Logical line of operation
Military of Afghanistan
Provincial Reconstruction Team

External links

References

Military of the Czech Republic
Ad hoc units and formations
Logar